The Great Midwest Conference Men's Basketball Player of the Year is a basketball award given to the Great Midwest Conference's most outstanding player. The award was short-lived and only handed out from 1992 to 1995. Four recipients received the award, but only Anfernee "Penny" Hardaway won more than once. Hardaway was the award's first and second all-time recipient as the Player of the Year.

The Great Midwest Conference was an NCAA Division I athletics conference which existed from 1991 to 1995. It was formed in 1990 with six members – Cincinnati and Memphis State (now Memphis) from the Metro Conference; UAB from the Sun Belt Conference; Marquette and Saint Louis from the Midwestern Collegiate Conference (now the Horizon League), and independent DePaul.  Dayton joined in 1993.

In 1995 reunification with the Metro Conference and teams from the Southwest Conference formed Conference USA.

Winners

Winners by school

References

NCAA Division I men's basketball conference players of the year
Player Of The Year
Awards established in 1992
Awards disestablished in 1995